Pimpri Nirmal  is a village in Rahata taluka of Ahmednagar district in the Indian state of Maharashtra. Literacy rate is almost 100 percent.

Population
As per 2011 census, population of village is 5,958, of which 3,102 are males and 2,856 are females.

Economy
Primary occupation of village is agriculture and allied work. From last few years Pomegranate and grapes are the main farming and cultivation  in large area. 
Good water management example is implemented in this village. Every farmer in this village those have either Pomegranate and grapes farming have its own water tank in the farm . In the summer this water is used for farming.

Transport

Road
Nagar - Manmad highway passes through a village. Nearby villages are connected by rural roads.

Rail
Sainagar Shirdi railway station is the nearest railway station to a village. Even Shrirampur(Belapur) is 22 km away from Pimpari Nirmal and also connected  with railway.

Air
Shirdi Airport is the nearest airport to a village.

See also
List of villages in Rahata taluka

References 

Villages in Ahmednagar district